Municipal elections were held across the Canadian province of Nova Scotia on October 20, 2012.

Selected mayoral races are as follows. Each town and regional municipality in the province held an election for mayor, while one county (Colchester) and one municipal district (Lunenburg) held races for mayor as well.

Amherst

Bridgewater

Cape Breton Regional Municipality

Mayor

Council

Colchester County

Halifax Regional Municipality

Kentville

Lunenburg (Town)

District of the Municipality of Lunenburg

New Glasgow

Oxford

Region of Queens Municipality

Truro

Yarmouth (Town)

References

Municipal elections in Nova Scotia
2012 elections in Canada
2012 in Nova Scotia
October 2012 events in Canada